The 2010 Valencian Community motorcycle Grand Prix was the final round of the 2010 Grand Prix motorcycle racing season. It took place on the weekend of 5–7 November 2010 at the Circuit Ricardo Tormo in Cheste, Valencian Community. It was Valentino Rossi's last race during his first stint at Yamaha before moving to Ducati Corse in 2011 and the last race at Ducati Corse for the rider he replaced, Casey Stoner who moved to Repsol Honda for 2011.

MotoGP classification

Moto2 classification

125 cc classification

Championship standings after the race (MotoGP)
Below are the standings for the top five riders and constructors after round eighteen has concluded.

Riders' Championship standings

Constructors' Championship standings

 Note: Only the top five positions are included for both sets of standings.

References

Valencian Community motorcycle Grand Prix
Valencian
Valencian motorcycle
21st century in Valencia